Sarawut Jaipech (Thai สราวุธ ใจเพชร), is a Thai futsal Defender, and currently a member of  Thailand national futsal team.

References
 
 

Sarawut Jaipech
1988 births
Living people
Sarawut Jaipech
Southeast Asian Games medalists in futsal
Sarawut Jaipech
Competitors at the 2011 Southeast Asian Games